Hugo Boucheron (born 30 May 1993) is a French representative rower, a dual Olympian and an Olympic and world champion. He won the double sculls event at the 2018 World Rowing Championships in Plovdiv. He competed in the men's double sculls at the 2016 Summer Olympics. Partnered with Matthieu Androdias he won the Olympic gold medal in the double scull at Tokyo 2020.

References

External links
 

1993 births
Living people
French male rowers
Olympic rowers of France
Rowers at the 2016 Summer Olympics
Rowers at the 2020 Summer Olympics
Sportspeople from Lyon
European Rowing Championships medalists
World Rowing Championships medalists for France
Medalists at the 2020 Summer Olympics
Olympic medalists in rowing
Olympic gold medalists for France
21st-century French people